The Robert Award for Best Non-American Film is an award presented by the Danish Film Academy at the annual Robert Awards ceremony. The award has been handed out since 1997. Between 1984 and 1996 a Robert Award for Best Foreign Film was handed out.

Honorees

1990s 
 1997: Il Postino: The Postman – Michael Radford
 1998: The Full Monty – Peter Cattaneo
 1999: My Name Is Joe – Ken Loach

2000s 
 2000: All About My Mother by Pedro Almodóvar & Life Is Beautiful by Roberto Benigni
 2001: Crouching Tiger, Hidden Dragon – Ang Lee
 2002: Moulin Rouge! – Baz Luhrmann
 2003: Amélie – Jean-Pierre Jeunet
 2004: Good Bye, Lenin! – Wolfgang Becker
 2005: Evil – Mikael Håfström
 2006: Downfall – Oliver Hirschbiegel
 2007: The Lives of Others – Florian Henckel von Donnersmarck
 2008: Eastern Promises – David Cronenberg
 2009: Everlasting Moments – Jan Troell

2010s 
 2010: Slumdog Millionaire – Danny Boyle
 2011: An Education – Lone Scherfig
 2012: The King's Speech – Tom Hooper
 2013: Amour – Michael Haneke
 2014: Blue Is the Warmest Colour – Abdellatif Kechiche
 2015: Force Majeure – Ruben Östlund
2016: Mommy – Xavier Dolan
2017: Son of Saul – László Nemes
2018: The Square – Ruben Östlund
2019: Border – Ali Abbasi

2020s 

 2020: Parasite – Bong Joon-ho
 2021: Portrait of a Lady on Fire – Céline Sciamma

See also 

 Bodil Award for Best Non-American Film

References

External links 
  

1997 establishments in Denmark
Awards established in 1997
Awards for best film
Non-American Film